The Theatre of Bretón de los Herreros (Spanish: Teatro Bretón de los Herreros) is a nineteenth-century theatre located in Logroño, Spain.
The theatre has had its present name since 1902 when it was renamed in honour of Manuel Bretón de los Herreros.
It was declared Bien de Interés Cultural in 1983.

References 

Bien de Interés Cultural landmarks in La Rioja (Spain)